Black Family Channel (launched in 1999 as MBC Network) was an American cable television network which featured programming aimed at African-American audiences. The network's schedule included a variety of programs including religious programs, sports, music, talk shows, and  children's programs. During much of the time of its existence, it was the only fully black-owned and operated cable television network (BET was bought by Viacom in 2001, and TV One was owned by Comcast and Radio One at the time) in the United States.

The network was started by noted Florida attorney and philanthropist Willie E. Gary, former all-star baseball player Cecil Fielder, four-time heavyweight boxing champ Evander Holyfield, Marlon Jackson of The Jackson 5, and broadcast television veteran Alvin James through their business venture Major Broadcasting Corporation.

The channel started off as Major Broadcasting Cable (MBC) Network. The name was rebranded Black Family Channel on October 1, 2004 in hopes that it would better identify the channel's content.

BFC would effectively be run by actor/director Robert Townsend, who developed original programming for the network, including its most notable effort—the children's educational game show, Thousand Dollar Bee, in which every kid would participate in sort of tournament rounds of spelling challenges toward which the champion would receive a $1,000 bond for their college education.

Unlike its primary rival, the Viacom-owned BET, Black Family Channel avoided rap and hip hop-based programming (they showed gospel music instead).   The network was available in up to 16 million households in the United States.

On April 24, 2007, BFC announced that they would cease as a cable channel, effective April 30, 2007, as part of a deal in which BFC's programming and subscriber base would be sold to the Gospel Music Channel.  On May 1, 2007, the deal was closed.

The station was an associate member of the Caribbean Cable Cooperative.

Over-the-air coverage
Formerly, the network was also carried on two low-power television stations, W23BC serving the Jackson, MS media market, and WRCX-LP, which serves the Dayton, Ohio area. W23BC has since affiliated with Colours TV and (more recently) America One. WRCX has since affiliated with Ion Television.

References 

Television channels and stations established in 1999
African-American culture
Defunct television networks in the United States
African-American television networks
Internet television channels
Gospel music media
Television channels and stations disestablished in 2007
1999 establishments in the United States